"Club Fed" is a derisive term used in North America to refer to a prison whose accommodations are seen as less severe than many other prisons. Club Fed is a pun on the "Club Med" chain of all-inclusive resorts. The 1999 movie Office Space made a reference to this style of prison by referring to it as a "white-collar, minimum-security resort." However, later in the film, a lawyer rebuts this view by stating that residents of federal prisons are subject to physical and sexual violence.

In Canada, the Joliette Institution for Women was nicknamed "Club Fed" because of the prison's supposedly luxurious conditions and lax restrictions, claims the prison has denied. Also in Canada, the William Head Institution in British Columbia is known as "Club Fed" due to its pastoral country setting which includes tennis courts, baseball diamond, and a small golf course.

See also
List of U.S. federal prisons
Alderson Federal Prison Camp
Incarceration in the United States: Security levels

References

Prisons in the United States
Prisons in Canada
Pejorative terms